Takei is a Japanese surname. Notable people with the surname include:

Emi Takei (born 1993), Japanese actress, fashion model, and singer
Esther Takei Nishio (1925–2019), selected as a "test case" as the first World War II internee of Japanese descent to return from camp and enroll in a California university
George Takei (born 1937), American actor
, Japanese pole vaulter
Hiroyuki Takei (born 1972), Japanese manga writer
, Japanese dancer
Koji Takei (born 1990), Japanese water polo player
, Japanese classical mandolinist
, Japanese sculptor
Sō Takei (born 1973), Japanese tarento and former track and field athlete
Takuya Takei (born 1986), Japanese football player
Tokiji Takei (1903–1991), Japanese poet
Yasuo Takei (1930–2006), the founder and former chairman of Takefuji

Fictional characters
Junko Takei, a character in the media franchise Strike Witches

See also
7307 Takei, a main-belt asteroid

Japanese-language surnames